Vancouver-Kingsway is a provincial electoral district of the Legislative Assembly of British Columbia in Canada.

Member of Legislative Assembly 

Since 2005, the district's member of the Legislative Assembly (MLA) has been Adrian Dix. He represents the British Columbia New Democratic Party.

History

Election results 

|-

|-

|NDP
|Alicia Barsallo
|align="right"|5,429
|align="right"|32.78%
|align="right"|
|align="right"|$41,185

|}

|-

|NDP
|Glen Clark
|align="right"|10,525
|align="right"|55.46%
|align="right"|
|align="right"|$35,297

|-

|Independent
|Protais Haje
|align="right"|69
|align="right"|0.36%
|align="right"|
|align="right"|$972

|Natural Law
|Steven R. Beck
|align="right"|65
|align="right"|0.34%
|align="right"|
|align="right"|$136

|}

|-

|NDP
|Glen Clark
|align="right"|9,292
|align="right"|54.79%
|align="right"|
|align="right"|$43,714
|-

|}

1991 recall referendum

1991 initiative referendum

See also 
Vancouver Kingsway (federal electoral district)

References

External links 
BC Stats
Results of 2001 election (pdf)
2001 Expenditures (pdf)
Results of 1996 election
1996 Expenditures
Results of 1991 election
1991 Expenditures
Website of the Legislative Assembly of British Columbia

Politics of Vancouver
British Columbia provincial electoral districts
Provincial electoral districts in Greater Vancouver and the Fraser Valley